Relm may refer to:

 Mike Relm (born 1978), also known as DJ Relm, a turntablist
 Relm Foundation, a charitable organization formerly part of the William Volker Fund

Fictional characters:

 Relm Arrowny, a character in the Final Fantasy VI video game
 Jake Relm, a character played by Nicholas Brendon in the Scifi Channel film Fire Serpent

See also 

 Realm (disambiguation)